Patrick Geering (born 12 February 1990) is a Swiss professional ice hockey defenceman who currently serves as captain of the ZSC Lions in the National League (NL). He participated at the 2010 IIHF World Championship as a member of the Switzerland men's national ice hockey team.

Playing career
Geering began his career in the youth system of the ZSC Lions. In the 2006–07 season he made his professional debut for GCK Lions in the National League B. In the following season he continued with GCK and the Swiss U-20 national ice hockey team in the National League B. In 2008 he returned to the ZSC Lions for the 2008–09 season in the National League A and appeared in 47 games with five assists. In 2009, Geering participated in the Champions Hockey League, which he won with the ZSC Lions in the finals against Metallurg Magnitogorsk.

On 7 January 2017, Geering was signed to a two-year contract extension by the Lions worth CHF 1.6 million. Prior to the 2017–18 season, Geering replaced Mathias Seger as captain of the ZSC Lions.

Career statistics

Regular season and playoffs

International

References

External links

1990 births
Living people
GCK Lions players
Ice hockey players at the 2018 Winter Olympics
Olympic ice hockey players of Switzerland
Swiss ice hockey defencemen
Ice hockey people from Zürich
ZSC Lions players